Balcatta is an electoral district of the Legislative Assembly in the Australian state of Western Australia.

The district is based in Perth's northern suburbs. A historically safe Labor seat, it was held by the Liberal Party for one term between 2013 and 2017.

Geography
Balcatta is located in Perth's northern suburbs. It is a north-to-south elongated electorate, squeezed in between the Mitchell Freeway to the west and Wanneroo Road to the east. The district includes the suburbs of Balcatta, Stirling, Tuart Hill, Joondanna and Westminster as well as all parts of Osborne Park east of the Mitchell Freeway.

History
Balcatta has had several incarnations as an electoral district. It has been held by the Labor Party on every occasion, other than a single term from 1905 to 1908.

The first incarnation of the seat, established by the Redistribution of Seats Act 1904, was spelt "Balkatta" in some sources and "Balcatta" in others. It extended all the way from modern-day Sorrento to Herdsman Lake, and was won by Labor's Frederick Gill at its first election in August 1904. However, the minority government of which he was part, referred to in the press as a "Mark-Time Ministry", collapsed a year later, and Gill and a number of other Labor members lost their seats in the 1905 election to Ministerial candidates. John Veryard held the seat for a single term, losing it to Gill in 1908. The seat was then abolished by the Redistribution of Seats Act 1911, with most of it going to form the new seat of Leederville, which Gill subsequently won.

A new district of Balcatta was created ahead of the 1962 state election, and was won by Labor's Herb Graham, who for the previous 19 years had been the member for East Perth, which was abolished at the redistribution. Graham represented the district for over a decade, before retiring from politics on 30 May 1973 to accept a position on the Licensing Court. At the resulting by-election held on 28 July 1973, which was watched by many observers both as an indication of Premier Tonkin's two-year-old Labor government's fortunes with the electorate as well as the more practical matter of whether it would retain its one-seat majority in parliament, former television news reporter and Labor candidate Brian Burke won by 30 votes on preferences, having trailed Liberal candidate Neil Beck on the primary vote. The seat was renamed Balga effective from the 1974 state election.

The name Balcatta was revived for the district one term later at the 1977 state election, after a redistribution in 1976. Burke once again won the seat, and ultimately became the Labor Party leader and State Opposition Leader on 28 September 1981.

At the 1982 redistribution, which took effect from the 1983 state election, Balcatta was significantly altered. Having previously included the suburbs of Balcatta, Balga, Girrawheen, Nollamara, Westminster and parts of Osborne Park, it moved west of Wanneroo Road and southwards into Tuart Hill and Joondanna, while a new district of Balga was created to take in the other areas. Burke transferred into Balga, while the member for the abolished seat of Mount Hawthorn, Labor's Ron Bertram, transferred into Balcatta.

The district was again abolished ahead of the 1996 state election. Incumbent Labor MP Nick Catania unsuccessfully contested the new seat of Yokine.

Balcatta returned as an electorate name at the 2005 state election. The seat was won by Labor MP John Kobelke, who was previously the member for Nollamara.

Members for Balcatta

Election results

References

External links
 ABC election profiles: 2005 2008
 WAEC district maps: current boundaries, previous distributions

Balcatta